Roger-Yves Bost (born 21 October 1965) is a French show jumping rider. He won a team gold medal at the 2016 Rio Games and finished fourth at the 1996 Olympics.

Bost started competing in horse riding aged eight following his father, Roger Sr., a former international equestrian. Bost's children Clementine and Nicolas are also competitive equestrians. In 2007 he received the Order of Agricultural Merit from the French government.

International Championship Results

References

1965 births
Living people
French show jumping riders
French male equestrians
Equestrians at the 1996 Summer Olympics
Equestrians at the 2016 Summer Olympics
Olympic equestrians of France
Olympic gold medalists for France
Olympic medalists in equestrian
Medalists at the 2016 Summer Olympics
Competitors at the 1993 Mediterranean Games
Mediterranean Games competitors for France
Mediterranean Games gold medalists for France
Mediterranean Games medalists in equestrian